Samuel Marvin (1664–1754) was a member of the Connecticut House of Representatives from Norwalk, Connecticut Colony in the May 1718 session. He served as a townsman in 1702, 1707, 1710, 1712, 1714, 1717, 1724, and 1727.

He was the son of Matthew Marvin, Jr., one of the founding settlers of Norwalk and Mary Brush Marvin.

On June 3, 1723 he was appointed by a town meeting to a committee to seat the new meeting-house, of which his brother-in-law, Joseph Platt, was chairman.

From February 1732, until his death, he lived in Wilton parish, which, at the time was part of Norwalk. His house in Norwalk was still standing in 1902.

References 

1664 births
1754 deaths
Connecticut city council members
Members of the Connecticut House of Representatives
People from Wilton, Connecticut
Politicians from Norwalk, Connecticut
People of colonial Connecticut